The Oldsmobile 98 (spelled Ninety-Eight from 1952 to 1991, and Ninety Eight from 1992 to 1996) is the full-size flagship model of Oldsmobile that was produced from 1940 until 1942, and then from 1946 to 1996. The name – reflecting a "Series 90" fitted with an 8-cylinder engine – first appeared in 1941 and was used again after American consumer automobile production resumed post-World War II. It was, as it would remain, the division's top-of-the-line model, with lesser Oldsmobiles having lower numbers such as the A-body 66 and 68, and the B-body 76 and 78. The Series 60 was retired in 1949, the same year the Oldsmobile 78 was replaced by the 88. The Oldsmobile 76 was retired after 1950. This left the two remaining number-names to carry on into the 1990s as the bread and butter of the full-size Oldsmobile lineup until the Eighty Eight-based Regency replaced the 98 in 1997.

Occasionally additional nomenclature was used with the name, such as L/S and Holiday, and the 98 Regency badge would become increasingly common in the later years of the model. The 98 shared its General Motors C-body platform with Buick and Cadillac.

Since it was the top-line Oldsmobile, the series had the most technologically advanced items available, such as the Hydramatic automatic transmission, the Autronic Eye, an automatic headlight dimmer, and Twilight Sentinel (a feature that automatically turned the headlights on and off via a light sensor and a delay timer, as controlled by the driver), and the highest-grade interior and exterior trim.

First generation (1941)

Naming standards were in flux at Oldsmobile during the late 1930s and 1940s. From 1932 through 1938 Oldsmobile had two series: "F" and "L". F-Series came with a straight 6 engine and L-Series came with a larger body and a straight 8 engine. The F-Series was replaced by the Series 60 in 1939 and L-Series was replaced with the Series 70. The Series 60 used the GM A-body and the Series 70 used the B-body. In 1940 the even larger C-body was introduced to Oldsmobile and it alone was powered by the straight-8. The series were also given names for the first time that year with the Series 60, 70, and 90 being called the Special, Dynamic, and Custom Cruiser respectively. In 1941 both engines were offered on each series so to differentiate between the two the second digit was used to denote the number of cylinders, so the Custom Cruiser 90 was replaced with the Custom Cruiser 96 and 98. In 1942 Oldsmobile dropped the six cylinder Series 90 model leaving only the Custom Cruiser 98.

The new C-body that the 1940 Oldsmobile Custom Cruiser Series 90 shared with Cadillac Series 62, Buick Roadmaster and Super, and the Pontiac Torpedo featured cutting-edge "torpedo" styling. Shoulder and hip room was over  wider, running boards were eliminated, and the exterior was streamlined and  lower. When combined with a column mounted shift lever the cars offered true six passenger comfort. A total of 43,658 90s were sold in four body styles. The rarest was the 4-door convertible with only 50 being sold.

A deluxe equipment package was now offered. The top-of-the line Oldsmobile was available in three body styles on the 96 and in four body styles on the 98. Rarest of these was the 4-door convertible which was exclusive to the 98. Only 119 were sold in 1941 and this would be the only time this body style was ever offered on the 98. The other three body styles were a convertible coupe, a club coupe fastback and a 4-door sedan. This was also the only year in Oldsmobile history that a 96, a 90 series car with a six-cylinder engine, was available. Hydramatic automatic transmission, first introduced in October 1939, was a popular option. A total of 24,726 98s and 6,677 96s were sold in 1941.

Second generation (1942, 1946–1947)

In 1942 the Custom Cruiser 98 was once again the Oldsmobile entrant into the luxury market. Gone was the single year offering of the 96. All cars in this series were powered by the straight eight engine. Also gone in this shortened model year was the ultra rare 4-door convertible. An exclusive  inch wheelbase was used in the series. A total of 6,659 98s were made before production was shut down due to World War II. To celebrate the company's 44th anniversary all Oldsmobiles received a small badge on the grille with "B44" attached. This was not a model designation.

When production was resumed in 1946 the Custom Cruiser 98 remained the top of the Oldsmobile line. Three body styles were offered (a 4-door sedan, a 2-door Club coupe and a 2-door convertible) and all were eight cylinder powered. Technical features included electro hardened pistons, full pressure lubrication and automatic choke with fast idle mode. Standard equipment included front and rear bumper guards, vacuum booster pump, dual sun visors, cigarette lighter and plastic radiator ornament, wraparound bumpers, Deluxe instrument cluster clock, rear armrest, and foam rubber seat cushions. Available upholstery was either leather, broadcloth, or Bedford cord. 14,364 98s were sold in its first postwar year of production.

In 1947 the top of the line Custom Cruiser 98 again had three body styles. This was the last year for the 98 1942 prewar body. All 98s had the straight eight engine. Standard 98 equipment included safety glass, spare wheel and tire, dual horns, vacuum booster pump, cigarette lighter, and a solenoid starter system. Upholstery was either custom broadcloth or leather. An electric clock was standard in 1947. A record 37,140 98s were sold in 1947.

Third generation (1948–1953)

For the first time since 1940 Oldsmobile offered totally different styling during a single model year. The top of the line 1948 Oldsmobile 98 was also included in a marketing campaign for what Oldsmobile called "Futuramic" on all 1949 Oldsmobiles primarily focused on the automatic transmission 1948 Oldsmobile Futuramic introduction. Standard equipment on 98s included a solenoid starter, fender skirts, E-Z-l rearview mirror, and foam rubber seat cushions. The 98s also included front and rear bumper guards, vacuum booster pump, plastic radiator ornament, dual horns, dual sun visors, and cigarette lighter. Deluxe equipment added front and rear floor mats, Deluxe steering wheel, wheel trim rings, rear seat armrests, and hydraulic window, seat and top controls on all convertibles. Upholstery was either broadcloth or leather. The standard tire size was 6.50 x 16. The Custom Cruiser name was retired until 1971 when it was used to denote full-size Oldsmobile station wagons. The new styling was apparently popular with a record 65,235 98s sold, exceeding the number of 90s sold in 1940 for the first time.

The following year the new styling was joined by a new engine, the now famous Rocket V8. In February 1949, several months into the model year, General Motors introduced three highly styled "hardtop convertible" coupes, the Oldsmobile 98 Holiday, the Cadillac Series 62 Coupe de Ville, and the Buick Roadmaster Riviera, the first hardtop coupes ever produced. The Holiday was exclusive to the 98 series that year. Available in four special Holiday colors, as well as four two-tone combinations, it was priced the same as the convertible, and was similarly equipped, with hydraulically operated windows and seat. Only 3,006 Holidays were sold in its first year compared to 20,049 Club coupes. Total sales reached 93,478 in 1949, setting yet another record.

The 1950 Oldsmobile 98 repeated its 1948 precedent of previewing some of next years styling cues for the 88. The 98 was restyled after only two years. It was the first totally slab sided Oldsmobile and the first sedan with wraparound rear windows. A 4-door 98 fastback appeared for one year only in 1950 and was called the Town Sedan, selling only 1,778 units. Standard equipment included bumper guards, dual horns, parking lamps, dome light, rubber floor mats, aluminum sill plates, foam rubber seat cushions, chrome interior trim, lined luggage compartment and counterbalanced trunk lid. Deluxe 98 equipment included rear seat armrest, Deluxe electric clock, Deluxe steering wheel and horn button, special door trim and stainless steel wheel trim rings. Upholstery choices spanned nylon fabric, striped broadcloth or leather. In 1950, Oldsmobile stopped naming the 98 series and so from then through 1996, with the exception of 1957 when it was called the Starfire 98, and in 1961 when it was called the Classic 98, it was simply known as the Oldsmobile 98. Sales of the 98 Holiday nearly tripled to 8263, approaching the 11,989 sold of the Club coupe. Given the rapidly growing popularity of the 2-door Holiday hardtop, 1950 was the last year for the pillared Club coupe. Total sales set yet another record of 106,220.

The 98 topped the Oldsmobile line again for 1951 with Three body styles available. The 4-door sedan and convertible came only with Deluxe equipment, while the Holiday hardtop was available with either Deluxe or Standard trim. The 98 standard equipment included bumper guards, cigarette lighter, dome light, rubber floor mats, stainless steel moldings, lined trunk, illuminated ashtray, foam rubber seat cushions and extra chrome moldings. Deluxe equipment was special rear door ornament, rear center armrests, Deluxe electric clock, Deluxe steering wheel with horn ring and special chrome trim. Upholstery choices were nylon cord, nylon cloth and leather. The pillared Club coupe was no longer offered. With the only choice in a closed 2-door 98 now being the hardtop, Holiday sales nearly doubled to 17,929 units.

From 1952 the car, which remained as the top of the line Oldsmobile, began to be called Ninety-Eight. This would continue until the demise of the model, with the exception of model years 1957 and 1961. The series shared the higher output 160 HP Rocket V8 with the Super 88s. Standard equipment on the three body styles included bumper guards, gray rubber floor mats front and rear, electric clock, dual horns, aluminum door sill plates, chrome gravel guards, foam rubber seat cushions, turn signals, carpeting front and rear, stainless steel wheel trim rings, windshield washer, and Deluxe steering wheel with horn ring. Upholstery selection was broadcloth or six colors of leather. For the first time power steering was an option. Another new option was the Autronic Eye, an automatic headlight dimmer, which in its initial year was shared only with Cadillac.

New in 1953, the Fiesta joined the Cadillac Series 62 Eldorado and Buick Roadmaster Skylark as top-of-the-line, limited-production specialty convertibles introduced that year by General Motors to promote its design leadership. It featured a cut-down belt line, a wraparound windshield that was  lower than the standard Ninety-Eight's windshield, and special "spinner" hubcaps, which became a trademark on later Oldsmobiles. Virtually every Oldsmobile option was standard except air conditioning, regarded as unnecessary at the time in a convertible.

Mechanically, the Fiesta had a special version of the Ninety-Eight engine which gained 5 horsepower to 170 through manifold streamlining and compression increased from 8.1:1 to 8.3:1. A four speed Hydramatic automatic transmission and faster rear axle rato were designed to keep the 4459 pound shipping weight Fiesta (336 more than a standard Ninety-Eight convertible) up to Oldsmobile performance standards. At US$5,715 ($ in  dollars ) (over $700 ($ in  dollars ) more than the Skylark) the Fiesta was nearly twice the US$2963 price ($ in  dollars ) of a standard Ninety-Eight convertible, with only 458 units produced to its 7,521.

Standard equipment for 1953 included bumper guards, electric clock, lined trunk, dual horns, cigarette lighter, chrome moldings, twin interior sun visors, rear seat robe rails, special rear stainless steel trim, chrome window ventiplanes, windshield washer, and Deluxe steering wheel with horn ring. In 1953 a padded safety dash also became standard on the Ninety-Eight. For the first time air conditioning was an option.

The Fiesta convertible would be gone the next year but its name would be resurrected in 1957 for Oldsmobile station wagons.

Fourth generation (1954–1956)

The 1954 Oldsmobiles were redesigned across the line, with a three body style Ninety-Eight series remaining at the top. Convertibles were called the Starfire, after the previous year's Starfire dream car. A slightly higher horsepower  Rocket V8 was shared with the Super 88 series. Standard Ninety-Eight equipment included bumper guards, rubber simulated carpets front and rear, electric clock, lined trunk, dual horns, cigarette lighter, aluminum door sill plates, turn signals, chrome rocker panel moldings, deck lid ornament, foam rubber seat cushions, padded dash, parking brake light, courtesy light package, stainless steel wheel discs, windshield washer, and deluxe steering wheel with horn ring. Upholstery choices were nylon and leather, in a variety of colors. A slightly modified 1954 Holiday Coupe was used as a press car during the final Carrera Panamericana in 1954. Optional air conditioning was available on sedans and hardtops, which consisted of a self-contained Frigidaire unit retrofitted at the customers request.

The 98 rode on an exclusive  wheelbase,  longer than the 88. Standard equipment included turn signals, bumper guards, stainless steel moldings, dual horns, cigarette lighter, front and rear floor mats, inside rearview mirror, foam rubber seat cushions, stainless steel rocker panel moldings, front seatback robe cord, spun glass hood insulation, rear window ventiplanes, electric clock, stainless steel wheel discs, custom cushion lounge seats front and rear, hand brake light, courtesy light package, padded dash, Deluxe steering wheel with horn ring, and windshield washer. Upholstery choices were covert and pattern cloth, leather and pattern cloth, leather and nylon, and leather and dimple leather. The optional air conditioning unit was moved to the engine bay instead of the trunk. The turning diameter was 43 ft. The Hydramatic automatic transmission gear selector had an S on it, which was used for better performance climbing hills. At mid-year, Olds introduced the new pillarless four-door hardtop body, dubbed the Holiday Sedan, in the Ninety-Eight series. The 4-door Oldsmobile Ninety-Eight Holiday Sedan, along with the 4-door 88 Holiday and the 4-door Buick Century Riviera and 4-door Special Riviera, were the first 4-door hardtops ever produced. Total Ninety-Eight sales for 1955 set a new record of 118,626.

Power came from the 240 horsepower Rocket V8 shared with the Super 88. Standard equipment included armrests, bumper guards, lined trunk, rotary door latches, dual horns, cigarette lighter, turn signals, rubber floor mats, aluminum door sill plates, sun visors, front and rear carpeting, foam rubber seat cushions, courtesy lights, front fender medallions, deck lid "Ninety-Eight " script, back-up light moldings, electric clock, Jetaway Hydramatic Drive, padded dash, power steering, windshield washers and Deluxe steering wheel. Upholstery choices were pattern cloth and leather in a variety of colors and combinations. The parking brake was now a foot pedal.

Fifth generation (1957–1958)

The Oldsmobile line underwent a sweeping reengineering in 1957, with a 3-piece rear window making a reappearance on some models. Once again the 4-door 98s were at the top, this year officially named Starfire 98. Standard equipment included armrests, turn signals, rubber floor mats, sun visors, front fender chrome script, exposed chrome roof bows, side interior courtesy lights, electric windows, special emblems, power steering, power brakes, and Jetaway Hydramatic. Upholstery choices included a variety of cloth, "Morocceen" (vinyl), and leather. The standard engine was now the  Rocket V8. A safety recessed steering wheel was added.

A major styling change was seen in 1958. The Ninety-Eight series again had its own exclusive wheelbase of 126.5 inches while sharing the more powerful Rocket V8 with the Super 88. The 1958 models shared a common appearance on the top models for each brand; Cadillac Eldorado Seville, Buick Limited Riviera, Oldsmobile 98, Pontiac Bonneville Catalina, and the Chevrolet Bel-Air Impala; the Starfire nameplate was cancelled. Four body styles were available. 

Standard series equipment included four headlights, oil filter, turn signals, printed circuit instrument cluster, aluminum anodized grille, padded dash, foam rubber padded seat cushions, courtesy lights, parking brake light, special side moldings, chrome rocker panel moldings, Jetaway Hydramatic transmission, power steering and brakes, dual exhaust, electric clock, color accented wheel discs, and chrome wheel frames. Interiors could be ordered in a variety of colored leathers, cloth, and "Morocceen" vinyl. Air suspension was added as an option. Also new was a speed warning device, which could be set towards a certain speed and when the limit was reached, a buzzer would sound, alerting the driver of the vehicle to slow down.

Sixth generation (1959–1960)

For 1959, the Oldsmobile line-up was completely redesigned. However, unlike other GM makes (such as Chevrolet and Cadillac) Oldsmobile continued to use a full perimeter frame, instead of the GM X-frame. The Ninety-Eight shared its appearance with the Oldsmobile 88. Oldsmobile stayed with its top series format by offering four body styles on an exclusive  wheelbase: a four-door sedan, a two-door hardtop, a four-door hardtop and a convertible. For 1959 and 1960 only, the hardtop body styles were dubbed "Holiday SceniCoupe" and "Holiday SportSedan" respectively, while the convertible continued the traditional "Convertible Coupe" moniker. Each body style had a distinctive greenhouse, shared with other 1959 GM cars. The 4-door sedan had six side windows and a sloping roof; the 2-door hardtop had a very large rear window and thin pillars; the 4-door hardtop sported a "floating roof" look, with a large wrap-around rear window. Standard equipment included oil filter, turn signals, air scoop brakes, Safety spectrum speedometer, rocker panel moldings, special emblems, parking brake light, sponge vinyl headliner, deep twist carpeting, electric clock, wheel trim moldings, power steering, power brakes, and Jetaway Hydramatic Drive. Interiors were selected from leather, "Morocceen" vinyl, or cloth in different colors. The , the largest first generation Rocket V8, was used from 1959 until 1964.

For 1960, the Ninety-Eight was completely restyled, while keeping the underlying structure and rooflines of the 1959 models. All four body styles were carried over, and the four-door sedan was renamed "Celebrity Sedan" — a designation used only one year on the Ninety-Eight, but that was continued on 88 sedans up to 1965. Standard equipment included Safety-vee steering wheel, turn signals, air scoop brakes, electric windshield wipers, safety-spectrum speedometer, carpets with rubber inserts, padded dash, courtesy lamps, wheel trim rings, Star-lite headliner, two-speed windshield wipers, chrome roof side moldings, Jetaway Hydramatic transmission, power steering, power brakes, windshield washers, electric clock, and deep twist carpeting. Upholstery was fabric, leather, or "Morocceen" vinyl in a variety of colors. An anti-spin rear axle was optional.

Seventh generation (1961–1964)

For 1961, and 1961 only, the Oldsmobile Ninety-Eight was renamed Classic Ninety-Eight ; nevertheless, most factory literature refers to the line as the Ninety-Eight. A fifth body style was added to the four offered since 1955: a 4-door 6-window hardtop, previously exclusive to Cadillac and the Buick Electra. The "Holiday Sedan" name was transferred to it, and the 4-door 4-window hardtop body style was instead called the "Sport Sedan". This was the first time not all Oldsmobile hardtops were called Holidays. The sedan, which like in the two previous two years was a 6-window body style, was now called the "Town Sedan". Another peculiarity of the 1961 models was that, with the exception of the convertible, no 98 body styles shared its roofline with the 88. Overall sales dropped from 59,364 to 43,010, the Ninety-Eight’s low point following the production record set in 1955. Standard equipment included padded dash, Safety spectrum speedometer, floating propeller, air scoop brakes, two-speed windshield wipers, Safety-Vee steering wheel, parking brake lamp, courtesy lamps, oil filter, windshield washer, electric clock, Roto Hydramatic transmission, power steering and power brakes. Upholstery was vinyl, cloth or leather. Standard tire size was 8.50 x 14 inches. With the  Rocket now standard equipment on the Oldsmobile 88, a higher compression version was made standard equipment on the 98 and Super 88 with horsepower rising to 325 in 1961 and 330 in 1962. It was dubbed the "Skyrocket" from 1961-63.

The 1961 through 1964 Oldsmobiles lost their dependable (but expensive to build) Jetaway Hydramatic transmissions. Replacing those four-speed units was a much cheaper to build three-speed unit, the Roto Hydramatic. This transmission had no front fluid coupling at all, and utilized a single "fill-and-dump" coupling to perform double duty as both a fluid coupling in third speed while having a third reaction member, which Olds called an "Accel-O-Rotor," which was actually a small stator, thus giving some limited torque multiplication in first. In theory, the "Accel-O-Rotor" would provide the same multiplication range in first as both the first and second gears of the four speed unit without all the hardware and cost. It was also unique at that time in that second speed was pure mechanical connection from engine to rear end and no fluid coupling involved. The problem with this transmission was that engine speed would race wildly in first, and then hit a "brick wall" of a very steep RPM decline in second, which was equivalent to third gear in the four speed Jetaway Hydramatic. This unit was unpopular and would linger for only these three years, when it was replaced by the Turbo Hydramatic in 1965. Customer complaints caused many dealers and independent transmission shops to wholesale replace the Roto Hydramatic in these cars with older (or contemporary, from a Pontiac Star Chief or Bonneville) HM315 four speed Hydramatic.

The largest 1962 Oldsmobiles were again the Ninety-Eights. Five body styles were offered including three 4-doors plus an open and a closed 2-door. The Holiday Coupe was renamed the Holiday Sport Coupe, and the Sport Sedan was renamed the Holiday Sport Sedan, so once again, at least temporarily, all hardtops were called Holidays. Ninety-Eights were well appointed with standard equipment including padded dash, guard beam frame, live rubber body cushions, coil springs, foam rubber seats, two-speed windshield wipers, parking brake lights, courtesy lamp package, special moldings, Roto Hydramatic, power brakes, power steering, power windows and power seat. Interiors were leather, vinyl or cloth. Standard tire size was 8.50 x 14 inches.

Again, in 1963, the top-of-the-line Oldsmobile Ninety-Eight had an exclusive  wheelbase. A new body style was the Custom Sports Coupe hardtop. It was the only body style with the 345 horsepower Starfire engine. The 4-door 6-window hardtop was renamed the Luxury Sedan (often condensed to L/S). The convention of naming all hardtops Holidays would not again return until 1965. Standard equipment included die-cast grille, deep pile carpeting, 21-gallon fuel tank, full-flow oil filter, foam seat cushions, foot-operated parking brake, two-speed windshield wipers, special molding package, Deluxe steering wheel, map light, heavy duty air cleaner, courtesy lights, Roto Hydramatic, power brakes, power steering, special rocker panel moldings, self-regulating electric clock, dual rear seat cigarette lighters and special headliner. Interiors were leather, vinyl or cloth. Standard tire size was 8.50 x 14 inches. Ninety-Eights were now made only in Lansing, Linden, Kansas City, Southgate and Wilmington. 

In 1964 the top of the line Ninety-Eight series was offered in six body styles in 2-door, 4-door and convertible configurations. Standard equipment included: Roto Hydramatic; power steering, brakes, windows and seats; windshield washer; special wheel discs; clock; courtesy and map lights and padded dash. Upholstery was a variety of colored cloth, vinyl and leather. Standard tire size was 8.50 x 14 inches. Ninety-Eights were now built only in Lansing.

Eighth generation (1965–1970)

The 1965 Ninety-Eight was completely redesigned from the ground up along with other full-sized General Motors cars but retained the larger C-body shared with Cadillac and Buick Electra in contrast with the B-body used in the Oldsmobile 88. The Ninety-Eight featured many of the lines found on 88s but with more squared off styling. The exclusive Ninety-Eight wheelbase had five body styles. The Custom Sport Coupe was gone and the 4-door 6-window body styles were replaced with 4-door 4-window body styles. The Luxury Sedan was no longer a hardtop but featured a more luxurious interior along with more standard amenities than the Town Sedan such as power seats. Most Ninety-Eight Luxury Sedans also had vinyl roofs, which were offered only in black that year. For the first time since 1962 all hardtops were once again called Holidays.

Standard equipment included automatic transmission, power steering and brakes, power windows, clock, padded dash, foam padded seats, parking brake light, Deluxe steering wheel, special wheel covers, windshield washer and two-speed electric wipers, courtesy and glovebox lamps, and front seat belts. Standard tire size was 8.55 x 14 inches. A new three-speed Turbo-Hydramatic automatic transmission with torque converter replaced the three-speed Roto Hydramatic. Along with the transmission and redesigned platform, the engine was also new for 1965: a  Super Rocket V8 that was more powerful and of a more efficient design than the  Rocket V8 previously used, yet lighter in weight. Ninety-Eights were built only in Lansing.

Between 1965 and 1975 Oldsmobile commissioned Cotner-Bevington to build professional cars, (ambulances and hearses), using the large Ninety-Eight chassis.

Some luxury market buyers purchased either the Starfires or the new Toronados in 1966 but the Ninety-Eight remained the full-size top-of-the-line Oldsmobile. Five models, including a trio of 4-doors were available. Standard equipment included: Turbo-Hydramatic transmission; power steering, brakes, windows and seats; special wheel covers; front and rear seat belts; carpeting; windshield washer and two-speed wipers; foam seat cushions; electric clock and special armrests on selected models. Upholstery was cloth, vinyl and leather. Standard tire size was 8.55 x 14 inches. Ninety-Eights were built in Lansing.

For 1967 there were five Ninety-Eight body styles available. Standard Ninety-Eight trim included: armrests, power brakes, dual cigarette lighters, electric clock, carpeting, lamp package, molding package, seat belts, power seats, power steering, Turbo-Hydramatic and power windows. Upholstery was cloth, vinyl or leather. Standard tire size was 8.85 x 14 inches. Ninety-Eight models were built in Lansing. The split grille appearance, which had been implemented in 1966 on the Cutlass and 88 series models appeared on the 98 series.

In 1968 Oldsmobile continued to produce five Ninety-Eight body styles. Standard equipment included: dual master cylinder, four way flasher, energy-absorbing steering column, back-up lights, side marker lights, seat belts, cross-flow radiator, rear armrest ashtrays, power brakes, electric clock, special moldings, shoulder belts, Deluxe steering wheel, power steering, carpeted trunk and Turbo-Hydramatic transmission. Upholstery was cloth, vinyl or leather. Standard tire size was 8.85 x 14 inches. Engine displacement was increased to the Rocket  V8 with 365 horsepower. Ninety-Eight production was in Lansing.

The 1969 Ninety-Eight remained the top-of-the-line Oldsmobile. It was the largest Oldsmobile product offered and now had a  wheelbase. Six body styles were now available with a hardtop version of the Luxury Sedan added to the lineup. New to the Ninety-Eight series were a recessed padded instrument panel, anti-theft lock within the steering column, rear view mirror map light, mini-buckle seat belts, and deeply padded head restraints. Standard equipment included: power brakes, self-regulating electric clock, full carpeting, courtesy lamps, paint stripes, power seat adjuster, seat belts and shoulder harnasses, power steering, Deluxe steering wheel, power windows, Turbo-Hydramatic transmission, custom sport seat, foam padded front seat, and wheel discs (hub caps). Standard tire size was 8.85 x 14 inches. Upholstery was vinyl, cloth or leather. The Ninety-Eight's standard engine was still the Rocket 455 which required premium leaded gas. All Ninety-Eights were made in Lansing and had the code letter M.

Some of the available 1969 options were a tilt-telescope steering wheel, instant horn, four season air conditioning with comfortron, tinted glass windshield, 6-way power seat, divided front seat with dual controls, power trunk release (vacuum), power door locks, power front disc brakes, AM-FM stereo radio, rear seat speaker, stereo tape player (8-track), power operated antenna, door edge guards, cruise control, left outside remote control mirror, cornering lamps, anti-spin rear axle, vinyl roof, flo-thru ventilation, and safety sentinel.

Of the Ninety-Eight series, the 1969s were the only models to have an attached hood extension. After receiving numerous complaints from dealership mechanics about hitting their heads on the extension, Oldsmobile changed the style of the hood in 1970, removing the extension, which resulted in a flat hood design.

In 1970, the Ninety-Eight continued as Oldsmobile's largest model. Standard equipment included: Turbo-Hydramatic 400 transmission, power steering, power brakes with front discs, power windows, power seats, Deluxe steering wheel, electric clock and full wheel discs. Standard tire size was J78-15. Interiors were vinyl, cloth or leather. All Ninety-Eights were made in Lansing indicated by the codel letter M in the Vehicle Identification Number. The length grew to 225.2 inches.

Ninth generation (1971–1976)

Oldsmobile built its biggest full-size car in 1971 although wheelbase was unchanged from 1970. The Ninety-Eights were the roomiest Oldsmobiles ever built thanks to the new GM full-size bodies which, at 64.3" front shoulder room and 63.4" rear shoulder room, set a record for interior width that would not be matched by any car until the full-size GM rear-wheel drive models of the early to mid-1990s. The 1971 through 1976 Ninety-Eight was very similar to the Oldsmobile 88 (which by now was called the "Delta 88") except the Ninety-Eight had a longer passenger compartment owing to its 3" longer wheelbase, and had rear Cadillac-esque tailfins to better differentiate between the two full-size models.

Despite this, a few 1975 and 1976 Ninety Eights were released from this catalytic converter requirement in Canada and were given certification along with exemption from requiring unleaded gasoline. V8s were progressively detuned as production wore on in line with tighter emission standards. Trunk mounted louvers for the flow through ventilation system were only found on 1971 models (as in many other GM models of 1971). The louvers were moved to the doorjambs for 1972-1976 models. From 1971 to 1976, Oldsmobile's full-sized Custom Cruiser station wagon shared the  wheelbase and 455 cubic-inch V8 with the Oldsmobile Ninety-Eight, and shared its interior and exterior styling, in particular the Ninety-Eight's distinctive front fascia and rear quarter panels complete with fender skirts.

The number of body styles was reduced to four for 1971. The convertible was gone as were the 4-door sedan body styles. A new body style was the Luxury Coupe. For the first time ever all Oldsmobile Ninety-Eights were now hardtops, and for the first time since 1964 not all hardtops were called Holidays. Standard equipment included armrests, front and rear, power brakes with front discs, electric clock, carpeting, inside hood release, lamp package, power seat, power steering and Turbo-Hydramatic transmission. Standard tire size was J78-15. Interiors were vinyl, cloth and leather. Ninety-Eights were built in both Linden and Lansing.

Four body styles were offered in the Ninety-Eight series for 1972. Standard equipment included: Deluxe armrests, dual ashtrays, power brakes with front discs, electric clock, carpeting, interior hood release, remote control outside mirror, molding package, interior light package, windshield radio antenna, power seat, power steering, spare tire cover and Turbo-Hydramatic transmission. A midyear version of the 4-door hardtop named the Regency was produced to commemorate Oldsmobile's 75th year as an automaker. For the first time in 17 years the Ninety-Eight set a new sales record of 121,568.

In 1973 a five body style Ninety-Eight series was at the top end of the Oldsmobile line. The 75th anniversary Regency 4-door hardtop continued, following its successful mid-1972 introduction. Standard equipment included: Deluxe armrests, dual ashtrays, power brakes with front discs, cigarette lighter, carpeting, inside hood release, dome light, molding package, windshield radio antenna, foam sheet cushions, power steering, Deluxe steering wheel, Turbo-Hydramatic transmission and wheel opening covers. Standard tire size was L78-15. Upholstery was vinyl or cloth. The Oldsmobile Ninety-Eight set another record of 138,462 sold.

The 1974 Ninety-Eight was now Oldsmobile's longest running series dating back to 1941, and was still popular. Five models were offered with the Regency Coupe taking the place of the Luxury Coupe. Standard equipment included: power brakes with front discs, cigarette lighter, electric clock, interior hood release, lamp package, molding package, remote control outside mirror, windshield radio antenna, power steering, Deluxe steering wheel, spare tire cover, power windows, power seat and Turbo-Hydramatic transmission. Standard tire size was J78-15. Upholstery was vinyl, cloth or leather.

From 1974 to 1975 the Ninety-Eight reached a record length of 232.4 in (5903 mm), when federally mandated  bumpers were added both front and rear increasing the overall length of the cars by several inches, while 1976 model year saw minimal length reduction to 232.2 in (5898 mm). It is also worth to note that 1974 Oldsmobile Ninety-Eight 4-door hardtop was the longest car with that body style sold that year, since the longer Lincoln Continental, Cadillac Sixty Special and Cadillac Series 75 were basically sedans (and 1974 Lincoln Continental came only with one hardtop body style: the 2-door). The 1974-76 Oldsmobile Ninety-Eight (as well as all full-size Oldsmobiles, Buicks and Cadillacs) also were among the first US production cars to offer an air bag option ("Air Cushion Restraint System") beginning in 1974. Very few cars were so equipped. The high cost ($700) plus public uncertainty about the yet-to-be proven safety systems that are now universal in today's automobiles saw quite handily to that.

The number of Ninety-Eight body styles was reduced in 1975. Four were available consisting of coupes or 4-door hardtops in Luxury or Regency trim. Two door models were no longer hardtops. Standard equipment included: power brakes with front discs, cigarette lighter, electric clock, electronic ignition, hood release, bumper impact strips, lamp package, 455 CID engine, molding package, remote-controlled outside mirror, power seat, power windows, power steering, Deluxe steering wheel, chrome wheel discs and Turbo-Hydramatic transmission. Standard tire size was J78-15. Upholstery was vinyl, cloth or leather.

In 1976 the Luxury and Regency editions of the full-size Ninety-Eights were offered, in 2-door coupes or 4-door hardtops. 4-doors had an extra window (like an opera window) in the C-pillar. A landau roof option for the coupe gave it a huge-looking opera window. Like the Custom Cruiser, Ninety-Eights had a dual section eggcrate-design grille, with new front end panel, front bumper, and wraparound horizontal parking lamps. Amber marker lenses aligned with the headlamps wrapped around the fender sides. Separate clear cornering lamps had horizontal ribs. Vertical taillamps were decorated with a small emblem in each lens. Tiny back-up lamps stood alongside the license plate, on a panel that also contained small red lenses next to the tail lamps. Standard Ninety-Eight equipment included a 455 CID Rocket V8 with 4-barrel carburetor, Turbo-Hydramatic, vari-ratio power steering, power brakes, power driver's seat, driver's door armrest control console, electronic message center, electric clock, fold-down center armrests, front ashtray, and JR78 x 15 blackwall steel-belted radials. Rear fender skirts and bumper impact strips were also standard. A new 2.41:1 axle ratio became standard to improve fuel economy.

Ninety-Eight Regency

For the 1972 model year, the Limited Edition Regency was offered to commemorate Oldsmobile's 75th anniversary. Each 1972 Oldsmobile Ninety-Eight Regency was registered at Tiffany's and included the specially styled interior with black or covert gold "pillow effect" velour upholstery, and power split bench seat, in place of the power bench seat with a rear clock. Tiffany touches include the Tiffany Gold paint (an exclusive custom metallic color created especially for this car), the clock has also been specially styled by Tiffany's and bears a white Oldsmobile emblem above Tiffany's name on a golden face. Each 1972 Regency owner received a distinctive sterling silver key ring as a gift. If they were lost, the keys could be dropped in a mailbox, and Tiffany's would return them to the owner. A total of 2,650 75th anniversary Ninety-Eight Regency cars were built, all of them four-door hardtops. In 1973 the non-anniversary Regency stayed in the line up slotted just above the LS. The Regency package would remain available on the Ninety Eight through the 1996 model year when it would become a separate model nameplate.

Tenth generation (1977–1984)

The 1977 model was redesigned and downsized, like the Delta 88. The new models, at around 4000 pounds curb weight, were over 800 pounds lighter, but headroom and rear seat legroom were increased compared to equivalent 1976 models. The 455 CID engine was replaced by the smaller 403 CID V8, and the Oldsmobile 350 V8 was now the standard engine. The Ninety-Eight set a new sales record of 139,423. A four-door sedan and a two-door hardtop coupe were available.

A diesel version of the 350 was added in 1978. Beginning in 1979, production of the Ninety-Eight was exclusive to Lansing as Linden Assembly was retooled to build the E-body cars. Base LS models were available as sedans only, and the premium Regency model came as either a coupe or a sedan. A limited production top level Regency LX sedan was also offered for 1979.

The Ninety-Eight was restyled for 1980, along with the Delta 88. That year, it gained a new 307 cu in (5.0 L) V8 as an option. The 403 was dropped completely. The 1980 models received new exterior sheet metal, without drastically changing the look of the car. To improve aerodynamics and fuel economy the hood was sloped downward, while the trunk area was higher. This also gave all models a heavier, more substantial appearance, while even slightly increasing interior and trunk space. The 1981 model year saw the introduction of Buick's 252 cu in V6 as standard, as well as a new 4-speed THM200-4R automatic transmission; the first standard 4-speed automatic since 1960. The gas 350 engine was dropped that same year, completely replaced by the smaller 307. A redesigned steering wheel and slightly revised instrument panel were also new that year. While the 1981 model used a V6 engine, the model designation stayed as "Oldsmobile 98" instead of being called the "Oldsmobile 96". The traditional naming convention established in the late 1930s used the second number as the number of cylinders.

The 1983 models received a new grille but were otherwise unchanged. The federal  impact standard was rolled back for 1984, prompting GM to make major changes to the bumpers to save weight; predictably, this drastically reduced their effectiveness. An optional 8-track tape player and the 4.1 L V6 were no longer available, though the CB radio was still optional. Production ended in March 1984. These cars were actually sold concurrently with the new front-wheel drive 1985 model. The body style reference in GM Manufacturing became "D" for the carryover RWD models, and the new FWD cars became C-bodies (which had been the designation used hitherto for the RWD cars).

Ninety Eight Regency Brougham
The new Regency Brougham model was introduced for 1982 and available for the sedan model only. This car featured plush "Prima" velour seats with embroidered emblems, cut pile carpeting, and electroluminescent opera lamps on the B-pillars. Wire wheel discs were also standard as well as Tungsten halogen headlamps, cornering lamps, full padded vinyl roof, and a tilt steering wheel. Regency became the new 'base' model as the LS was discontinued.

Eleventh generation (1985–1990)

In 1985, GM downsized the Ninety-Eight again, moving from rear-wheel drive to a new front-wheel drive platform, with sales beginning in April 1984. 

Now using GM's new C Platform, the revised Ninety-Eight was approximately  shorter in length and weighed  less than its predecessor. Significantly shorter, narrower, lighter and more fuel-efficient than the platform they replaced, the C Platform Ninety Eights were noted for having nearly the same key interior dimensions as their predecessors and a much more nearly flat passenger compartment floor — albeit with thinner seats and dramatically less upper tumblehome, locating windshield as well as side glass closer to passengers. 

1985 model year sales were 169,432 units, contrasted with the 1984's 76,833 units, an all-time sales record.

As in previous years, the 1985 Ninety-Eight was available as a 4-door sedan and a 2-door coupe, in either Regency or Regency Brougham trim. Both models featured standard velour seating, with optional leather seating surfaces, marketed as Sierra Grain leather. For the first year, the Buick 181 cu in V6 was the standard engine. V8 engines were no longer used with the Ninety-Eight. Optional engines included Buick's 231 and Oldsmobile's 263 cu in Diesel V6. The 3.0 gas V6 and 4.3 Diesel V6 were dropped for 1986.

Anti-lock brakes became optional for 1986 and a "Grande" package was offered in 1986 and 1987 with composite headlights and specific front end panel (1986 only), and 45/45 leather seats with pigskin inserts and console with a combination lock.

As the last year for the 2 door coupe, in 1987 all Ninety-Eights received a revised grille with flush composite headlamps. In 1988, a power pull-down trunk lid and an onboard computer with oil life monitor (marketed as the "Driver Information System") became optional. For the 1989 model year, the Ninety-Eight received another grille change and the addition of Twilight Sentinel headlights, optional remote keyless entry, an automatic dimming rearview mirror (which could be turned on and off), and an optional (but rarely ordered) drivers-side airbag.

By 1990, the engine for the eleventh-generation Oldsmobile Ninety-Eight featured a harmonic balancer and increased horsepower over 1985 models. Also in 1990, a PGA edition package for the Regency Brougham included gold PGA emblems, gold nameplate badging, gold striping, and wire wheels with gold emblems. 1990 would be the last year that the "Regency Brougham" trim level, first introduced in 1982, was offered on a Ninety-Eight.

 Size comparison between 1984 and 1985 Oldsmobile Ninety-Eight 

Engines

Touring Sedan

The Oldsmobile Touring Sedan (informally "TS") was a trim level of the Eleventh Generation Olsmobile Ninety Eight, marketed by Oldsmobile from 1987-1993 across two generations, both using the front-wheel drive GM C-platform.

Available as a four-door sedan, the TS targeted buyers of imported sports-luxury sedans, e.g., those from Audi, BMW, Mercedes-Benz and Acura.

Twelfth generation (1991–1996)

The final generation of the Oldsmobile Ninety Eight coincided with its 50th anniversary in 1991, continuing to use the GM C Platform with added length, rear fender skirts, wide tail, low nose, and a split-grille with wraparound headlights. The wheelbase remained unchanged from the previous generation, and overall length increased by over 9 inches (229 mm), mostly at the rear of the car, resulting in a larger trunk.

The final generation Ninety-Eight was available in two main trim levels: the traditional luxury-oriented Regency models and the performance-oriented Touring models. The engine choices included normally aspirated (all years) and supercharged (1992-1995) versions of the 3.8 L V6. To commemorate the 50th anniversary of the Ninety-Eight, Oldsmobile offered a "50th Anniversary" package in 1991. This limited edition model was available only in black or white and featured cloisonné front fender anniversary emblems, gold nameplate badging, gold striping, and unique gold accent alloy wheels. The interior was trimmed in burl walnut with gold accents.

In 1992, a new supercharged V6 engine became available on the Touring edition. Also that year, a new entry-level Regency trim model was added. On upper level Regency Elite models, a PGA edition package was offered which included gold PGA emblems, gold nameplate badging, gold striping, and unique gold accent alloy wheels. In 1993, a new value priced Special Edition model was added to the lineup and Ninety-Eight received an improved 3.8 L V6 engine offering better performance and fuel efficiency.

In 1994, the Touring model was discontinued but many of its features became standard or available on the Regency Elite including the supercharged engine. Additionally, the Ninety Eight added a standard front passenger-side airbag plus new instrument panel, steering wheel, and door panel designs. The exterior received a new cross-hatch grille as well as redesigned head- and side-marker lamps.

In 1995, Oldsmobile further simplified the Ninety Eight lineup by offering just two levels of Regency Elite (Series I and Series II). Each was offered with a high level of standard equipment and only a short list of extra cost options. Also that year, the standard 3.8 L V6 engine was again reengineered to improve performance and fuel efficiency. For 1996, the Ninety Eight's final year, changes were minimal. The most notable was the removal of the supercharged engine from the option list. That engine, however, remained available on Oldsmobile's performance LSS model.

Engines:
 1991–1996  V6
 1992–1995  supercharged V6

Trim levels:
Touring - 1991–1993
Regency Elite - 1991–1994
Regency - 1992–1994
Regency Special Edition - 1993–1994
Regency Elite Series I - 1995–1996
Regency Elite Series II - 1995–1996

Discontinuation
The Ninety Eight ended production on May 31, 1996. It was replaced by the Oldsmobile Aurora as the top level car in Oldsmobile's product line.

References

External links

 The 1980s Olds 98 Page
 Oldsmobile Ads from the Forties to the Sixties 
 The Oldsmobile Connection - The Site For Oldsmobile Enthusiasts
 Cotner-Bevington built professional cars using the Ninety-Eight chassis

98
Full-size vehicles
Rear-wheel-drive vehicles
Front-wheel-drive vehicles
Cars introduced in 1941
1940s cars
1950s cars
1960s cars
1970s cars
1980s cars
1990s cars